The Alton River Dragons are a collegiate summer baseball team located in Alton, Illinois. The Alton River Dragons were founded in 2020 and began play in 2021 as members of the Prospect League.

History
On January 29, 2020, the Prospect League of collegiate summer baseball announced that Alton, Illinois had been granted a franchise for the upcoming season. Alton previously hosted a minor league team when the 1917 Alton Blues played as members of the Illinois-Indiana-Iowa League.

The Alton franchise owner was announced as Steve Marso, who owned previous franchises in summer collegiate baseball. Dallas Martz was hired as the Alton General Manager.

The "River Dragons" moniker was announced for the Alton franchise on August 14, 2020. The name was chosen after a public submittal process.

On November 12, 2020, the Alton River Dragons announced the hiring of Darrell Handelsman to manage the 2021 Alton team. The Alton franchise had previously hired Brock Moss to manage the first team, but Moss had since accepted a position at Texas A&M International University, making him unavailable to coach Alton in the summer.

During the River Dragons 2nd Season in 2022 the team set a Prospect League team record for stolen bases with 210 stolen bases.  

The River Dragon's Eddie King JR. from the University of Louisville was name Mike Schmidt Prospect League Player of the Year.  King JR led the league with 15 home runs and stole 31 bases in 2022. 

Blake Burris set a new Prospect League record with 47 steals and was the league batting champion batting .361 for the season. 

On September 21, 2022, it was announced that Head Coach Darrell Handelsman was stepping down as Head Coach. 

On October 5, 2022, the River Dragons announce the hiring of Richard "Scotty" Scott as the teams next Head Coach.

Stadium
The Alton River Dragons play at Lloyd Hopkins Field in Gordon Moore Park. Renovations were discussed for the ballpark in anticipation of the 2021 season. The ballpark had previously hosted the Bluff City Bombers of the Central Illinois Collegiate League. The ballpark is located at 98 Arnold Palmer Road, Cottage Hills, Illinois, 62018.

Seasons

Roster

References

External links 
Alton River Dragons official site
Prospect League official site

2020 establishments in Illinois
Amateur baseball teams in Illinois
Prospect League teams
Baseball teams established in 2020
Alton, Illinois